This is a list of active South African Navy ships as of 2023. There are approximately 47 ships in commission, this includes 4 frigates, 3 submarines, 2 minesweepers, 1 replenishment vessel, 1 Survey vessel 5 tugboats and 31 patrol vessels.

Submarine fleet

Surface fleet

Auxiliary fleet

See also
List of decommissioned ships of the South African Navy

References

External links
South African Navy: Equipment

Ships of the South African Navy
South Africa